Gibellina cerealis is a fungal plant pathogen. It is a pathogen of wheat and similar species, causing white foot rot or basal stem rot.

References

Fungal plant pathogens and diseases
Magnaporthales